Yury Aleksandrovich Prilukov (born 14 June 1984) is a freestyle swimmer from Russia, who specializes in long distance swimming.

Prilukov was born in Sverdlovsk. He is a five-time European champion (long course), eight-time European champion (short course) and five-time World Short Course Champion and has also set three European records. At the 2004 Summer Olympics Prilukov finished sixth in the 400 meters freestyle and fourth in the 1500 metres freestyle. At the 2008 Summer Olympics he finished seventh in the 400 m freestyle and fourth once again in the 1500 m freestyle.

References
 Profile, from L'Equipe

1984 births
Living people
Sportspeople from Yekaterinburg
Russian male freestyle swimmers
Swimmers at the 2004 Summer Olympics
Swimmers at the 2008 Summer Olympics
Olympic swimmers of Russia
World Aquatics Championships medalists in swimming
Medalists at the FINA World Swimming Championships (25 m)
European Aquatics Championships medalists in swimming
Universiade medalists in swimming
Universiade gold medalists for Russia
Universiade silver medalists for Russia
Medalists at the 2007 Summer Universiade